Tiziano Scarpa (born 16 May 1963) is an Italian novelist, playwright and poet.

Born in Venice, he won the 2009 Strega Prize for his novel, Stabat mater.

Selected works
Venice is a fish (2003)
Stabat mater (2009)

References 
 Scarpa wins strega prize

1963 births
Living people
21st-century Italian novelists
Strega Prize winners
Writers from Venice
Italian male poets